Henrhyd Falls (Welsh: Sgwd Henrhyd) in the Brecon Beacons National Park, Wales, is the tallest waterfall in southern Wales with a drop of . It lies on National Trust land, in the county of Powys. The nearest settlement to it is Coelbren, on the road between Glynneath and Abercraf.  Though not in the core of the area, it is considered by many to constitute a part of Wales' celebrated Waterfall Country.

Geology
The falls occur where the small river, the Nant Llech drops over the faulted edge of a hard sandstone known as the Farewell Rock which forms the top half of the rock face and which forms the base of the South Wales Coal Measures. Beneath this, and forming much of the recessed portion of the drop, is the Subcrenatum Sandstone separated from the Farewell Rock above by the Subcrenatum marine band. Both the marine band and sandstone are part of the Bishopston Mudstone Formation included within the Marros Group, the modern name in South Wales for the assemblage of strata that was traditionally known as the Millstone Grit series. A stream gully between the descent path and the falls marks the line of the Henrhyd Fault which is responsible for the falls' presence.

One of the area's most famous visitors was Sir William Edmond Logan (later head of the Geological Survey of Canada). In 1833 he carried out detailed geological survey work in the area, discovering some 1.5 km down the valley from the foot of the falls the fossil trees which now stand in the garden at Swansea Museum. They are 'Object 1' in their 'History of Swansea in 20 Objects'.

Access

The waterfall is reached after a steep walk down into the valley from the car park established by the National Trust, and is a popular spot to visit. A further footpath leads steeply down to the falls via the opposite side of the valley, accessed from Heol Henrhyd, the road through Coelbren village.

See also
Ystradfellte

References

External links
images of Henrhyd Falls and surrounding area on the Geograph website

Fforest Fawr
Waterfalls of Powys
Tourist attractions in Powys
National Trust properties in Wales